C.L.I.F. 4 (Chinese: 警徽天职4, short-form for Courage, Loyalty, Integrity, Fairness, commonly pronounced as cliff) is a Singaporean police procedural series produced and telecast on MediaCorp Channel 8 in collaboration with the Singapore Police Force. The series stars Li Nanxing, Rui En, Zhang Yaodong, Elvin Ng and Ya Hui as the main characters of the series. The series is co-sponsored by Sheng Siong Supermarkets and Soon Bee Huat. This is also the first C.L.I.F. series to feature a VSC police officer.

Plot
Teo Kwee Xiang (Elvin Ng), who played a traffic police officer last season, will return to his NPC Community Policing Unit (CPU) as Senior Staff Sergeant and will take his relationship with Eng Xuan Bee (Sora Ma) one step further as marriage is on the cards for the couple.

The other anchor couple, Wee Lum Thiam (Li Nanxing) and Ng Tze Keat (Rui En) will welcome a new member to their family, Matthew Wee, but that doesn't mean Tze Keat will sit out of all the crime-busting action as the pair will continue to head their respective teams in the Criminal Investigation Department (CID).

New characters include Chan Yu (Zhang Yaodong), Ong Shi Shi (Ya Hui), Tsai Yen Chi (Mei Xin), Zhou Jingze (Yusuke Fukuchi) and Teo Hark Wee (Chen Tianwen). Out of the 5 new characters, 4 of them are among the 8 main characters of this series.

Chan Yu, a spot-on police officer, is stuck in a love triangle between Ong Shi Shi and Tsai Yen Chi, who are both
police officers (Yenqi joined later). Yenqi was once his ex-girlfriend who still had feelings for him. At the same time, Chan Yu isn't on good terms with his superior officer, Ng Tze Keat.

Cast

Main cast

Other cast

Development
The series was first announced to be under planning in 2016. Prior to the announcement, Elvin Ng mentioned that he will return for the fourth installment after he is done with the filming of If Only I Could, and Li Nanxing also mentioned that he will return for the series. In the House of Fortune press conference in January 2016, it was also announced that Ya Hui will be playing a cop in the series. On 23 February 2016, Li and Ng, together with the latest additions Zhang Yaodong, Ya Hui and Mei Xin attended a weapon training session at the Home Team Academy to prepare for the series; Rui En was absent as she was unwell. Imaging sessions were done in March, where Ng revealed a collaboration with Rui En in a L'Oréal commercial.

Bonnie Loo, who plays Yang Zhongzheng's daughter Hongxi, and ex-infotainment host Liu Kaixin hosted the lensing ceremony, held on 24 March 2016. Some of the cast members revealed that they diligently went to great lengths to prepare themselves for their roles by picking up a sport, or resuming their exercise regimes. They also talked about their brush with the law. It was also revealed that Yang Zhongzheng (Terence Cao) will die in the series and his funeral is filmed at Mount Vernon on 29 April.

A press conference was held at the Ministry of Home Affairs, New Phoenix Park on 23 August 2016. Li Nanxing, Elvin Ng, Sora Ma, Zhang Yaodong, Ya Hui, Mei Xin, Chen Tianwen, Yusuke Fukuchi and Bonnie Loo attended the conference. Notably absent was Rui En, who is in New Zealand to spend time with her father. A meet-and-greet session was held on 3 September at One KM Mall. Elvin Ng, Ya Hui, Sora Ma, Mei Xin, Chen Tianwen, Terence Cao and Bonnie Loo were present at the event. The first 150 audience to form the queue for the event got to receive an autographed poster and a goodie bag each.

Incident
On 12 April 2016, Rui En was reportedly involved in a Clementi car park accident, and this made waves all over the Internet the next day. Responding in an official statement on 14 April 2016 through her manager from Hype Records, she clarified the context of the conversation, and made an apology. Responding to media queries, executive producer Chong Liung Man said that they have no intention of replacing her or her character in the drama. Rui En showed up for work as usual on that day, but he gave her a day off as he was worried that she might not be in the most ideal state for shooting.

Potential sequel
Chong Liung Man shared that doing a sequel was "something the team strived towards to during C.L.I.F. 3". In a separate interview, he said, "When I was filming part 3, I told them the mission is to have a part 4. Now that it has succeeded, we’d have to wait for a few more years before knowing if part 5 will happen." He added that the drama's aim is to develop the characters and their back stories to make them more relatable and touching. Chong also expressed interest in doing a Singapore Army drama, if given the opportunity to shoot a similar drama about a different uniform group in Singapore, adding that "it has been a long time since we last did a proper drama about the army in MediaCorp."

Episodes

Awards & Nominations

Star Awards 2017
C.L.I.F. 4 has the least nominations in Star Awards 2017.

The other drama serials that are nominated for Star Awards 2017 are Hero, You Can Be an Angel 2, Fire Up and The Dream Job.

It won 1 out of 2 nominations.

See also
 When Duty Calls

References

Singapore Chinese dramas
Singapore Police Force
2016 Singaporean television series debuts
2016 Singaporean television series endings
Police procedural television series
Singaporean crime television series
Channel 8 (Singapore) original programming
C.L.I.F.